Orderly or Disorderly is a 1981 Iranian short film directed by Abbas Kiarostami.

See also
List of Iranian films

External links

Films directed by Abbas Kiarostami
1981 films
1980s Persian-language films
Iranian short films